Olena is an unincorporated community in Stronghurst Township, Henderson County, Illinois, United States.

History
Olena was laid out on August 14, 1838, by Robert Kendall. It had, in the 19th century, a population of approximately 300 inhabitants.

References

Further reading
History of Mercer and Henderson Counties

Unincorporated communities in Henderson County, Illinois
Unincorporated communities in Illinois
1838 establishments in Illinois